The 1923 Michigan Mines football team represented the Michigan College of Mines—now known as Michigan Technological University—as an independent during the 1923 college football season. Michigan Mines compiled a 2–0 record.

Schedule

References

Michigan Mines
Michigan Tech Huskies football seasons
College football undefeated seasons
Michigan Mines football